The Hansa-Brandenburg W.11 was a fighter floatplane built in Germany in 1917 as a more powerful version of the KDW. Similar in general configuration to its predecessor, the W.11 shared the same unusual interplane strut arrangement, and featured fins above and below the fuselage. Only three examples were built.

Specifications

References

1910s German fighter aircraft
W.11
Floatplanes
Single-engined tractor aircraft
Biplanes
Aircraft first flown in 1917